Marina Pellizzer  (born 8 February 1972) is an Italian women's international footballer who plays as a midfielder. She is a member of the Italy women's national football team. She was part of the team at the UEFA Women's Euro 2001. On club level she plays for Foroni Verona in Italy.

References

1972 births
Living people
Italian women's footballers
Italy women's international footballers
Place of birth missing (living people)
Women's association football midfielders
Foroni Verona F.C. players